Begin Again may refer to:

Film and TV
Begin Again (film), a 2013 film starring Keira Knightley and Mark Ruffalo
Begin Again (TV series), a South Korean reality show

Albums
Begin Again (Nutshell album), 1978
Begin Again (Kloq album), 2013
Begin Again (Norah Jones album), 2019
 Begin Again (soundtrack)

Songs
"Begin Again" (Space song), 1998
"Begin Again" (Taylor Swift song), 2012
"Begin Again", a song by Purity Ring on their 2015 album Another Eternity
"Begin Again", a song by Colbie Caillat on her 2009 album Breakthrough